Mun Tae-yeong (in Korean: 문태영; born as February 10, 1978 as Gregory Lee "Greg" Stevenson) is an American-born Korean basketball player. A  forward, he played for the South Korea national team.

High school and college career 
After attending Fayetteville High School, Stevenson committed to Penn State, where he would play from 1996 to 1998. Then, he transferred to Richmond where he would spend two more seasons.

Professional career 
Mun started his professional career in 2001 with the German team MTV Gießen. He went on to play for several teams in different countries n the following years, including France, the Netherlands and Hungary.

From 2009 to 2011, Mun represented Changwon LG Sakers of the Korean Basketball League (KBL).

In the summers, Mun represented Piratas de Quebradillas of the Puerto Rican Baloncesto Superior Nacional (BSN). He reached the BSN finals twice with the team, in both 2009 and 2011.

In 2011, he transferred to Ulsan Hyundai Mobis Phoebus where he stayed for three seasons. He won three straight championships in 2013, 2014 and 2015. From 2015 to 2020, Mun played for the Seoul Samsung Thunders.

Personal 
Mun has a brother, Jarod Stevenson (now known as Moon Tae-jong), who also was a professional basketball player and also adopted Korean citizenship.

References 

1978 births
South Korean men's basketball players
American men's basketball players
Small forwards
Landstede Hammers players
Dutch Basketball League players
Piratas de Quebradillas players
Seoul Samsung Thunders players
Changwon LG Sakers players
Rouen Métropole Basket players
Yakima Sun Kings players
Saint-Quentin Basket-Ball players
EiffelTowers Nijmegen players
Living people